Bethel Church (also known as New Bethel Church  or Bethel Methodist Church) is a historic Methodist church located on Missouri Highway T near Labadie, Missouri. The church was built in 1868 to replace a log building constructed in 1840 for Franklin County's first Methodist congregation. The red brick building has an unornamented Greek Revival design. The building has a Greek temple form with a low gable roof and square brick pilasters flanking the door and separating the large side windows. The interior of the church has a high ceiling, a balcony above the narthex, and white-painted features.

The church was added to the National Register of Historic Places in 1993.

References

Methodist churches in Missouri
Greek Revival church buildings in Missouri
Churches completed in 1868
Churches on the National Register of Historic Places in Missouri
Buildings and structures in Franklin County, Missouri
National Register of Historic Places in Franklin County, Missouri
1868 establishments in Missouri